Legislative Assembly elections were held in Himachal Pradesh in 1952.

Results

!colspan=8|
|- style="background-color:#E9E9E9; text-align:center;"
! class="unsortable" |
! Political party !! Flag !! Seats  Contested !! Won !! % of  Seats !! Votes !! Vote %
|- style="background: #90EE90;"
| 
| style="text-align:left;" |Indian National Congress
| 
| 35 || 24 || 66.67 || 84,819 || 47.25
|-
| 
| style="text-align:left;" |Kisan Mazdoor Praja Party
|
| 22 || 3 || 8.33 || 26,371 || 14.69
|-
|
| style="text-align:left;" |Scheduled Caste Federation
| 
| 9 || 1 || 2.78 || 10,352 || 5.77
|-
| 
|
| 36 || 8 || 22.22 || 47,746 || 26.6
|- class="unsortable" style="background-color:#E9E9E9"
! colspan = 3| Total seats
! 36 !! style="text-align:center;" |Voters !! 7,13,554 !! style="text-align:center;" |Turnout !! 1,79,515 (25.16%)
|}

Elected members

State Reorganization
Under States Reorganisation Act, 1956, Himachal Pradesh became a Union Territory on 1 November 1956, under the direct administration of the President of India and the Himachal Pradesh Legislative Assembly was abolished simultaneously. Under Punjab Reorganisation Act, 1966, following area of Punjab State namely Simla, Kangra, Kulu and Lahul and Spiti Districts, Nalagarh tehsil of Ambala District, Lohara, Amb and Una kanungo circles, some area of Santokhgarh kanungo circle and some other specified area of Una tehsil of Hoshiarpur District besides some parts of Dhar Kalan Kanungo circle of Pathankot tehsil of Gurdaspur District; were merged with Himachal Pradesh on 1 November 1966 and the next legislative elections were held in 1967.

References

External links
 Chief Electoral Officer, Himachal Pradesh

State Assembly elections in Himachal Pradesh
1950s in Himachal Pradesh
Himachal Pradesh